Udasar is a village in Bikaner tehsil in the state of Rajasthan in northern India. It is the original home of the Jajra pandits.

Villages in Bikaner district